Khufiya is an upcoming Hindi-language neo-noir spy thriller film written, produced and directed by Vishal Bhardwaj. The film is based on Amar Bhushan's espionage novel Escape to Nowhere. It stars Tabu, Ali Fazal, Wamiqa Gabbi, Ashish Vidyarthi, Azmeri Haque Badhon and Alexx O'Nell. The film is scheduled to be released on Netflix on 12 April, 2023.

Premise 
Krishna Mehra and Dev Mehra are operatives at the agent Research & Analysis Wing Department. She is assigned to track down the mole selling India's defense secrets, while grappling with her dual identity as a spy and lover. but krishna and mohini and victor is killing dies by Yashwant and Viraj is the two killers and murderist of krishna and mohini and victor but yashwant and viraj is the corrupt and ruthless two senior police officers cops of police force department

Cast 
 Tabu as Lieutenant General Krishna Mehra, Dev's elder sister & Sapna's elder sister in law 
 Ali Fazal as Lieutenant Brigadier Dev Mehra, Krishna's younger brother / Agent Khufiya, Sapna's fiance and husband , (as the shoot dead killer encounter officer of Yashwant & Viraj) 
 Wamiqa Gabbi as Mohini Singh Dagar, Central Bureau Investigation Department Officer Viraj's wife  
 Ashish Vidyarthi as corrupt and ruthless Assistant Commissioner of Police Officer Viraj Singh Dagar (the last main fearless antagonist villain award), (as the killer of Mohini , Krishna & Victor) Yashwant's Crime & Murdering Partner , Mohini's husband    
 Azmeri Haque Badhon as Lieutenant Brigadier Sapna Srivastava Mehra, Victor's & Yashwant's Younger sister, Dev's fiancee and wife, Krishna's younger sister in law 
 Alexx O'Nell as Victor Srivastava, Central Bureau Investigation Department Officer,  Yashwant's younger brother 
 Shataf Figar as corrupt and ruthless Assistant Commissioner of Police Officer Yashwant Srivastava, Viraj's Crime & Murdering Partner (the last main fearless antagonist villain award), (as the killer of Mohini , Krishna & Victor) 
 Jan Graveson as Murgi Phus Gayi Re Song Item Number Dancer / Himself

Production

Development
The  film was officially announced in September 2021.

Filming

Principal photography began in October 2021. The film final schedule commenced from April 2022.

Marketing
In September 2021, Short clip of the film was released from Netflix Tudum:A Global Fan Event.

Release
The film is scheduled to be released on Netflix in 2023.

References

External links 
 
 

Upcoming films
Upcoming Hindi-language films
Upcoming Netflix original films
Indian spy thriller films
Indian direct-to-video films
Films directed by Vishal Bhardwaj
Hindi-language Netflix original films
2023 films
2023 thriller films